The Bracero Monument by Dan Medina is installed in Los Angeles, California. The 19-foot-tall monument features a bronze sculpture of a Mexican migrant and his family (wife and son).

References 

2019 establishments in California
2019 sculptures
Downtown Los Angeles
Monuments and memorials in Los Angeles
Outdoor sculptures in Greater Los Angeles
Sculptures of children in the United States
Sculptures of men in California
Sculptures of women in California
Statues in Los Angeles